Nanna is a genus of moths in the subfamily Arctiinae. The genus was erected by Sven Jorgen R. Birket-Smith in 1965.

Species
Nanna broetheri Kühne, 2014 Rwanda
Nanna ceratopygia Birket-Smith, 1965 Cameroon, Nigeria, Gabon
Nanna collinsii Kühne, 2007 Congo
Nanna colonoides (Kiriakoff, 1963) Congo
Nanna diplisticta (Bethune-Baker, 1911) western Africa
Nanna distyi Kühne, 2014 Congo
Nanna eningae (Plötz, 1880) Cameroons
Nanna falcata Kühne, 2014 Rwanda
Nanna griseata Kühne, 2007 Ivory Coast
Nanna griseoides Kühne, 2014 Cameroons
Nanna hoppei Kühne, 2014 Congo
Nanna kamerunica Kühne, 2007 Cameroons
Nanna loloana (Strand, 1912) southern Cameroon
Nanna luteolata Kühne, 2014 Nigeria
Nanna magna Birket-Smith, 1965
Nanna melanosticta (Bethune-Baker, 1911) Angola
Nanna molouba Durante, Apinda-Legnouo & Romano, 2013 Gabon
Nanna naumanni Kühne, 2005 Kenya
Nanna pia (Strand, 1912) Cameroon
Nanna semigrisea Durante, Apinda-Legnouo & Romano, 2013 Gabon
Nanna tanzaniae Kühne, 2014 Tanzania

References

External links

Lithosiini